The Wisconsin Ledge AVA is an American Viticultural Area in northeast Wisconsin along the Niagara Escarpment (locally referred to as "The Ledge") in Door, Kewaunee, Manitowoc, Sheboygan, Ozaukee, Washington, Dodge, Fond du Lac, Calumet, Outagamie, and Brown counties. The state's third is the gargantuan Upper Mississippi River Valley AVA which also covers land in Minnesota, Iowa and Illinois.
After 7 long years, and 4000 hours, Steven J. DeBaker of Trout Springs Winery was granted his petition to the TTB for establishment of the Wisconsin Ledge AVA. It became the 203rd AVA in the US, including just under 2.5 million acres making it the 12th largest AVA in the US. Today, there are 24 bonded wineries that lie within the AVA with over 400 acres of vines planted.

The topography of Wisconsin Ledge is the result of ancient glacial movement over the region. The land on the peninsula slopes gently upward from the shores of Lake Michigan to the top of the Ledge, before dropping sharply off into Green Bay. Most of the vineyards lie on these eastern-facing slopes that benefit from constant air movement from Lake Michigan, which stores warmth during the summer. The presence of the lake produces a vacuum of sorts during the growing season: warm air over the lake rises, sucking colder air off the land and creating offshore breezes. Cold air cannot settle over the vineyards and there is a constant flow of warmer air, making the growing season here longer than in other parts of Wisconsin. Wisconsin Ledge's glacial soils are made up of gravel, sand and clay over limestone bedrock.  An aquifer below the AVA provides mineral-rich ground water to the vines, encouraging deep root growth. The hardiness zone is almost entirely 5b.

See also

American wine
List of American Viticultural Areas
Wisconsin (wine)

Notes and references

External links
Appellations of Origin from the TTB
American Viticultural Areas (AVAs) from the TTB
Interactive Google AVA map from American Winery Guide
 Upper Mississippi River Valley AVA
The Great River Road Wine Trail
Wisconsin Ledge AVA - Vineyards and Wineries, electronic map
American Viticultural Area Petition for Niagara Escarpment of Wisconsin, 2007
Viticulture: A "Grape" Idea, hosted by Victoria Cerninich with special guest Dean Volenberg, by Access Door County, Sevastopol TV, January 8, 2014, 24:06 long

American Viticultural Areas
Wisconsin wine
2012 establishments in Wisconsin